The DSL-G604T is a first D-Link Wireless/ADSL router which firmware is based on open source the MontaVista Linux. The DSL-G604T was introduced in November 2004. This model has been discontinued.

Specifications

Hardware 
 CPU: Texas Instrument AR7W MIPS 4KEc based SoC with built-in ADSL and Ethernet interfaces
 DRAM Memory: 16Mb
 Flash Memory: 2Mb SquashFS file system
 Wi-Fi: TI MiniPCI card
 Ethernet: 5-port Ethernet hub (1 internal, 4 external)

Firmware 
The G604T runs MontaVista and busybox Linux which allows a degrejje of customisation with customised firmware. These and similar units from D-Link appear to have an issue that causes certain services to fail when using the factory provided firmware, namely the Debian package update service being interrupted due to a faulty DNS through DHCP issue at the kernel level. A v2.00B06.AU_20060728 patch was made available through their downloads section that provided some level of correction, but it was not a complete fix and the issue would resurface intermittently. When the issue was originally reported, D-Link seemed to have misunderstood that the same issue has been discovered by the Linux community at large to be common across a number of their router models and they failed to provide a complete fix across the board for all adsl router models. 

Russian version of the firmware (prefix .RU, e.g. V1.00B02T02.RU.20041014) has restrictions on configuring firewall rules – user can only change sender's address (computer address in the LAN segment) and the recipient's port. The web interface with Russian firmware also differs from the English interface.

Default settings 
When running the D-link DSL-G604T router for the first time (or resetting), the device is configured with a default IP address (192.168.1.1), username (admin) and password (admin). Default username and password can also be printed on the router itself, in the manual, or on the box.

Problems

Security 
D-Link DSL-G604T has Cross-site scripting (XSS) vulnerability in cgi-bin/webcm on the router allows remote attackers to inject arbitrary web script or HTML via the var:category parameter, as demonstrated by a request for advanced/portforw.htm on the fan page.

Directory traversal vulnerability in webcam in the D-Link DSL-G604T Wireless ADSL Router Modem allows remote attackers to read arbitrary files via an absolute path in the getpage parameter.

When /cgi-bin/firmwarecfg is executed, allows remote attackers to bypass authentication if their IP address already exists in /var/tmp/fw_ip or if their request is the first, which causes /var/tmp/fw_ip to be created and contain their IP address.

Noise 
Owners reported that the router emitted a low, high-pitched sound when the ADSL line was synchronized.

Reception 
The DSL-G604T received positive reviews, receiving an 7.9/10 from PCActual, 3/5 from PCWorld. According to CNET, "DSL-G604T is a ADSL2/2+ modem router with some serious stability issues".

Similar models
The DSL-G624T, DSL-G664T and DSL-G684T routers are very similar to the G604T.

References

External links 
 DSL-G604T at LinuxDevices
 Review at Devellopez.com
 Official Product Page 

D-Link